Lapithiou is an abandoned village in the Paphos District of Cyprus, located 3 km south of Pano Panagia. Before 1974 it was mainly inhabited by Turkish Cypriots, whom abandoned the village and settled mainly in the occupied parts of Cyprus and London; after the Turkish invasion of Cyprus in 1974. Currently the houses in the village are rented out to foreign and local tourists by the government of Cyprus.

References

Communities in Paphos District